Gordon Ian Ash (born December 20, 1951) is Vice President of Baseball Projects of the Milwaukee Brewers. He left his role as assistant general manager with Milwaukee in 2015. He was the general manager of the Toronto Blue Jays from 1995 to 2001. 

Ash received a Bachelor of Arts degree from York University in 1974. After graduating, he started at the Canadian Imperial Bank of Commerce working in a branch. In 1978, he joined the Toronto Blue Jays Baseball Club in the ticket department. He quickly became Operations Supervisor in 1979, Assistant Director of Stadium Operations in 1980, Administrator of Player Personnel in 1984, and Assistant General Manager in 1989. 

From 1995 to 2001, he was the general manager. During his time the Blue Jays made many noteworthy draft picks, such as Roy Halladay, Craig Wilson, and Ryan Freel in 1995, Billy Koch in 1996, Vernon Wells, Michael Young, and Orlando Hudson in 1997, Felipe López in 1998, and Alex Ríos in 1999. A number of these prospects, most notably Michael Young, ended up being traded away before they fully developed. During his tenure, Toronto finished no better than 3rd in the AL East division, with a record of 541–575 over that span. After being replaced by J. P. Ricciardi, in 2001, he became a baseball analyst for TSN before he was appointed assistant general manager of the Milwaukee Brewers in 2003. David Stearns, who was hired as the Brewers' general manager after the 2015 season, reassigned Ash within the organization.

With Brewers owner Mark Attanasio and pitcher Ben Sheets, Ash is an investor in the Milwaukee Admirals minor league hockey team.

References

External links
 Gordon Ash at Baseball America
 

1951 births
Living people
Canadian sports businesspeople
Canadian people of Scottish descent
Major League Baseball farm directors
Major League Baseball general managers
Milwaukee Brewers executives
Businesspeople from Toronto
Toronto Blue Jays executives
York University alumni
Canadian sports executives and administrators
Canadian Baseball Hall of Fame inductees